A list of Eastern League seasons since inception of the league:

See also
List of Eastern League champions

External links
easternleague.com
Eastern League Champions from easternleague.com

 
Eastern League seasons